MusicHall is a cabaret-style musichall theatre specializing in live entertainment and cultural showbiz. It is located at Starco Center on Omar Daouk Street between Rue Petro Paoli and Rue Chateaubriand in the city centre of Beirut, Lebanon.

The MusicHall was opened in 2003 by its founder and co-owner Michel Elefteriades who converted an old cinema into a cabaret theatre with a mix of local and foreign acts. With up to twelve artists and bands performing each night, the MusicHall has rapidly become Lebanon's premier live music venue and one of its trendiest nightlife spots. The venue's performing styles focus mainly on World music fusion but also include jazz, pop, ethnic, belcanto, stand-up comedy and other genres.

The MusicHall has been an original, groundbreaking concept and remains a one-of-a-kind night venue in the MENA region.

In 2008, the MusicHall was established as a franchise and an interest in franchising this concept was expressed from a number of cities around the world, including São Paulo, Dubai, Cairo, Istanbul and Doha. The first MusicHall franchise was due to open in Qatar in early 2009, but because of the ongoing financial crisis, the opening was postponed.

In 2013, a second branch of MusicHall was opened in Dubai, UAE.

In that same year Elefteriades also opened "MusicHall Waterfront" in Beirut, an open-air venue near Downtown Beirut's sea side.

And in the summer of 2019, the MusicHall landed in Jeddah, making it the very first club to open in the Kingdom of Saudi Arabia.

References

External links
Al Jazeera reporting on the MusicHall (December 2008)
Transcripts from CNN's Your World Today (Aired November 20, 2006)
Musichall Beirut in the New York Times (April 29, 2010)
Gulf News: Global Hangout MusicHall Beirut (December 1, 2011)

Nightclubs in Lebanon
Buildings and structures in Beirut